A Secret Love is an 2020 American documentary film, directed by Chris Bolan. Ryan Murphy serves as a producer on the film, while Jason Blum serves as an executive producer under his Blumhouse Productions banner. It stars Terry Donahue and Pat Henschel. It was released on April 29, 2020, by Netflix.

Premise
A former All-American Girls Professional Baseball League player, Terry Donahue, and her partner, Pat Henschel, ran a successful interior decorating business while keeping their lesbian relationship a secret from their families for almost seven decades.

Cast
 Terry Donahue
 Pat Henschel
 Diana Bolan

Production
Chris Bolan, the director of the film, took a trip to visit his two great aunts, Terry Donahue and Pat Henschel. They told Bolan about their life together and after hearing it Bolan decided to tell their story via a documentary film.

Release
The film was scheduled to have its world premiere at South by Southwest in March 2020; however, the festival was cancelled due to the COVID-19 pandemic. It was released on April 29, 2020.

Reception 
The site's critics consensus reads: "In telling one couple's story, A Secret Love pays understated yet powerful tribute to a lifetime of choices and sacrifices made in the name of enduring devotion." On Metacritic, the film has a weighted average score of 77 out of 100, based on 12 critic reviews, indicating "generally favorable reviews".

Stephanie Zacharek of Time wrote that the film is "heartfelt." Robyn Bahr of The Hollywood Reporter wrote that A Secret Love is "tender without being cloying, naturalistic without seeming contrived."

Shannon Keating of Buzzfeed was critical of the film, writing of "the subtle but insidious homophobia baked into this very telling of their story."

References

External links
 
 
 

2020 films
American LGBT-related films
American documentary films
Blumhouse Productions films
Netflix original documentary films
Films produced by Ryan Murphy (writer)
Documentary films about lesbians
2020 LGBT-related films
2020 documentary films
2020s English-language films
2020s American films